Gasteranthus bilsaensis is a species of plant in the family Gesneriaceae. It is endemic to Ecuador.  Its natural habitats are subtropical or tropical moist lowland forests and subtropical or tropical moist montane forests.

References

Endemic flora of Ecuador
bilsaensis
Endangered plants
Taxonomy articles created by Polbot